Corunna Downs Airfield was a secret Royal Australian Air Force (RAAF) base at Corunna Downs,  south of Marble Bar in the Pilbara region of Western Australia during World War II.
In 1942 the RAAF built a secret airbase on Corunna Downs Station, adjacent to the 1891 homestead. The airfield, created especially for B-24 Liberator long-range heavy bombers, comprised two intersecting bitumen runways, a north–south (165°) runway  and an east–west (107°) runway .

No. 73 Operational Base Unit was responsible for operating the airfield during World War II.

The RAAF No. 24 Squadron, No 25 Squadron and the United States Army Air Corps 380th Bomb Group flew long range missions against Japanese shipping and base facilities in the Dutch East Indies.

The base has been abandoned since World War II.

See also
 List of airports in Western Australia

References

External links
 Travel Attractions Website
 OzatWar Website

Former Royal Australian Air Force bases
World War II airfields in Australia
Defunct airports in Western Australia
Western Australia during World War II
State Register of Heritage Places in the Shire of East Pilbara